Sonia Browne is a Barbadian politician and physician. She is a member of parliament in the House of Assembly of Barbados. She was first elected member of parliament in January 2018. She also serves as the Minister of State in the Ministry of Health. Browne is the Chairman of Committees in the 2018-2023 Parliament.

References 

Living people
Barbadian politicians
Government ministers of Barbados
Barbados Labour Party politicians
Year of birth missing (living people)